Ranjit Singh was an Indian politician who served as Member of Constituent Assembly of India from Patiala and East Punjab States Union. He was born in November, 1897 in Sangrur district.

References 

Members of the Constituent Assembly of India
1897 births
Year of death missing